Carleton County (2016 population 26,220) is located in west-central New Brunswick, Canada.

The western border is Aroostook County, Maine, the northern border is Victoria County, and the southeastern border is York County from which it was formed in 1831. The Saint John River bisects the western section of the county. The Southwest Miramichi River flows through the eastern section of the county. Potato farming is a major industry. The scenic town of Hartland is home to the longest covered bridge in the world.

Transportation

Major Highways

Census subdivisions

Communities
There are five incorporated municipalities within Carleton County (listed by 2016 population):

First Nations

There is one First Nations reserve in Carleton County, the Woodstock_First_Nation:

Parishes
The county is subdivided into eleven parishes (listed by 2016 population):

Demographics

Population trend

Mother tongue language (2011)

Protected areas and attractions

Notable people

See also
List of communities in New Brunswick

References

External links

Carleton County Colloquialisms
McCain Foods Ltd
Town of Woodstock
Town of Hartland
Falls Brook Centre

 
Counties of New Brunswick